Helbling is a surname. Notable people with the surname include:

Jeanne Helbling (1903–1985), French actress
Josef Helbling (born 1935), Swiss cyclist
Seifried Helbling, 13th-century Austrian poet
Thomas Helbling (born 1961), Swiss lawyer and politician
Timo Helbling (born 1981), Swiss ice hockey player